Joel Tan (Chinese: 陈文传; pinyin: ‘‘Chén Wén Chuán’’; (born 25 June 1987), is a Singaporean playwright and dramatist.

Biography 
Tan is the second son of three; his mother is a nurse and his father is a manager at a maritime company. He was educated at the National University of Singapore (NUS), and spent one semester abroad at the University of Notre Dame. He is currently pursuing a Masters in Dramatic Writing at Central Saint Martins.

Literary career 
During his time at NUS, he was mentored by Huzir Sulaiman. He is currently an Associate Artist with Checkpoint Theatre.

Tan is often termed a rising star; his work is  described as "beautiful and admirably complex", and has spanned a range of topics, such as single-sex parenting in Singapore, and younger Singaporeans grappling with the impact of progress. His body of work also frequently straddles genre boundaries, including drag theatre, naturalistic plays, and musical theatre.

He has also worked as dramaturge and director for a range of productions.

Works

References 

1987 births
Living people
Singaporean people of Chinese descent
Singaporean writers
Singaporean dramatists and playwrights
National University of Singapore alumni